The Canton Invaders was an indoor soccer club based in Canton, Ohio that competed in the National Professional Soccer League.
After the 1995–96 season, the team relocated and became the Columbus Invaders.

History
The Canton Invaders were a professional indoor soccer team from Canton, Ohio. Named by Michael George of Canton, Ohio. One of the charter members of the American Indoor Soccer Association (AISA), they played their home contests in the Canton Civic Center, a municipal owned facility in the downtown area of Canton, Ohio.

The Invaders and the AISA began play in 1984 with six teams (Chicago Vultures, Canton Invaders, Columbus Capitals, Kalamazoo Kangaroos, Louisville Thunder, and Milwaukee Wave). The Invaders won the league championships for the 1984–85 and 1985–86 seasons as well as advancing to the championship series for the 1986–87 campaign only to be defeated by their opponent of the previous two championship contests, the Louisville (KY) Thunder. (Footnote: The Louisville Thunder folded following the 1986–87 season.)

The following three seasons saw the Canton Invaders again capture the league championship crown but their attendance dwindled. A group of diehard fans continued to come to the home games and the seats behind one goal area became known as The Twilight Zone with spectators dressing in dark colored clothing and face painting for the Invaders’ motif. The area behind the other goal was actually the stage for the Canton Civic Center and no spectators were permitted to sit there during games.

Prior to the 1990–91 season, the league set about reinventing itself as the National Profession Soccer League (NPSL). Ten teams now reached from New York to Milwaukee and south to Jacksonville. In an effort to make the games more equitable, players were traded amongst the teams and the Canton squad’s ability to win a majority of their games was eliminated. Canton never again hoisted the championship banner in the Civic Center and for the 1996–97 season, the team relocated to Columbus where they compiled a dismal 5 and 35 record finishing dead last in the Central Division of the American Conference of the NPSL. The Invaders disbanded following one season in Columbus and players were distributed to the remaining dozen teams of the league.

The Invaders had a rivalry with the nearby Cleveland Crunch for their last five seasons of play.

The National Professional Soccer League continued operations for ten more seasons before officially folding operations. The ten teams of the league then established a re-structured league to be known as the Major Indoor Soccer League.

Coaches
 Klaas de Boer (1984–85)
 Trevor Dawkins (1985–88)
  Steve M. Paxos  (1988)
 Timo Liekoski 1989-1992)

Athletic trainers
Alex Villoneuva (1993–1995)
John D Smith (1995–1996)

Yearly awards
AISA Season MVP
1985–1986 – Don Tobin
1986–1987 – Rudy Pikuzinski
1987–1988 – Rudy Pikuzinski
1988–1989 – Rudy Pikuzinski
1989–1990 – Jamie Swanner

NPSL Season MVP
1991–1992 – Jamie Swanner

AISA Coach of the Year
1984–1985 – Klass De Boer
1985–1986 – Trevor Dawkins

AISA Defender of the Year
1984–1985 – Oscar Pisano
1985–1986 – Oscar Pisano
1986–1987 – Tim Tyma

NPSL Defender of the Year
1990–91 – Denzil Antonio

AISA Rookie of the Year
1986-1986 – Jamie Swanner

AISA Leading Goal Scorer
1986–1987 – Rudy Pikuzinski (51 Goals)
1987–1988 – Rudy Pikuzinski (24 Goals)

AISA Leading Points Scorer
1986–1987 – Rudy Pikuzinski (81 Points)
1987–1988 – Rudy Pikuzinski (42 Points)

AISA Goalkeeper of the Year
1986–1987 – Jamie Swanner
1988–1989 – Jamie Swanner
1989–1990 – Jamie Swanner

NPSL Goalkeeper of the Year
1990–1991 – Jamie Swanner
1991–1992 – Jamie Swanner

AISA All-Star Team
1984–1985 – Kia Zolgharnain, Oscar Pisano
1985–1986 – Oscar Pisano, Kia Zolgharnain, Tim Tyma, Don Tobin
1986–1987 – Jamie Swanner, Rudy Pikuzinski, Tim Tyma
1987–1988 – Rudy Pikuzinski
1988–1989 – Rudy Pikuzinski, Jamie Swanner
1989–1990 – Jamie Swanner, Rudy Pikuzinski

NPSL All-Star Team
1990–1991 – Jamie Swanner, Denzil Antonio, Gino DiFlorio
1991–1992 – Jamie Swanner

Year-by-year

References

Sports in Canton, Ohio
Defunct indoor soccer clubs in the United States
American Indoor Soccer Association teams
National Professional Soccer League (1984–2001) teams
Soccer clubs in Ohio
Defunct soccer clubs in Ohio
Association football clubs established in 1984
1984 establishments in Ohio
Association football clubs disestablished in 1997
1997 disestablishments in Ohio